Ronald Parks Hamm (February 16, 1951 – September 4, 2019) was an American political operative who served as Virginia Secretary of Natural Resources under Governor Jim Gilmore. He previously served as Gilmore's Deputy Secretary of Natural Resources and as an aide to Virginia Congressmen Tom Davis and Tom Bliley.

References

1951 births
2019 deaths
Virginia Republicans
State cabinet secretaries of Virginia
Place of birth missing
Place of death missing